The Skarshaugane Peaks are a group of peaks, including Mount Skarshovden, that extend south for 3 miles (4.8 km) from Hovdeskar Gap in the Humboldt Mountains of Queen Maud Land. They were discovered and photographed by the German Antarctic Expedition, 1938–39, mapped by Norway from aerial photos and surveys made by the Norwegian Antarctic Expedition from 1956–60, and named Skarshaugane ("the gap peaks").

See also
Taborovskiy Peak

Humboldt Mountains (Antarctica)
Mountains of Queen Maud Land